Gamsam Station is a station of the Daegu Metro Line 2 in Gamsam-dong, Duryu-dong, Dalseo District, and Naedang-dong, Seo District, Daegu, South Korea.

External links 
  Cyber station information from Daegu Metropolitan Transit Corporation

Daegu Metro stations
Dalseo District
Seo District, Daegu
Railway stations opened in 2005
2005 establishments in South Korea